Germán Andrés Hornos Correa (born 21 August 1982) is a Uruguayan former footballer.

References

1982 births
Living people
People from San José Department
Uruguayan footballers
Uruguayan expatriate footballers
Uruguayan Primera División players
Sevilla FC players
Real Valladolid players
Club Atlético River Plate (Montevideo) players
Centro Atlético Fénix players
C.A. Bella Vista players
Tacuarembó F.C. players
Central Español players
Ñublense footballers
Expatriate footballers in Chile
Expatriate footballers in Spain
Expatriate footballers in France
Uruguayan expatriate sportspeople in Spain

Association football forwards
Uruguay international footballers